Following is a list of dams and reservoirs in Wyoming.

All major dams are linked below.

List 

 Alcova Dam, Alcova Reservoir, United States Bureau of Reclamation
 Anchor Dam, Anchor Reservoir, USBR
 Big Sandy Dam, Big Sandy Reservoir, USBR
 Boysen Dam, Boysen Reservoir
 Buffalo Bill Dam (formerly Shoshone Dam), Buffalo Bill Reservoir, USBR
 Bull Lake Dam, Bull Lake Reservoir, USBR
 Flaming Gorge Dam, Flaming Gorge Reservoir, USBR
 Fontenelle Dam, Fontenelle Reservoir, USBR
 Glendo Dam, Glendo Reservoir, USBR
 Granite Springs Dam, Granite Springs Reservoir, City of Cheyenne
 Grassy Lake Dam, Grassy Lake Reservoir, USBR
 Guernsey Dam, Guernsey Reservoir, USBR
 Jackson Lake Dam, Jackson Lake, USBR
 Keyhole Dam, Keyhole Reservoir, USBR
 Kortes Dam, Kortes Reservoir, USBR
 Meeks Cabin Dam, Meeks Cabin Reservoir, USBR
 Worthen Meadow Reservoir, City of Lander
 Pathfinder Dam, Pathfinder Reservoir, USBR
 Pilot Butte Dam, Pilot Butte Reservoir, USBR
 Seminoe Dam, Seminoe Reservoir, USBR

See also
List of largest reservoirs of Wyoming
List of lakes in Wyoming
List of rivers in Wyoming

References

Wyoming
Dams
Dams